Suchatvee  Suwansawat (born 20 April 1972) is a professor of Civil Engineering at King Mongkut's Institute of Technology Ladkrabang (KMITL), where he served as the President of Institute from 2015 to 2021. In December 2021, he announced his intention to contest in the 2022 Bangkok gubernatorial election as a candidate for the Democrat Party.

Early life and education
Suchatvee was born on 20 April 1972 at Chonburi, eastern Thailand, but grew up in the neighbouring Rayong. Suchatvee father and mother worked as a teacher at Vocational school.

Suchatvee attended Rayongwittayakom School before graduating from King Mongkut’s Institute of Technology Ladkrabang (KMITL) with a Bachelor of Construction Engineering.

At the age of 20, Suchatvee envisioned an underground transport system for the capital, submitting “Bangkok’s Subway Tunnel Design” as his final undergraduate project.

He subsequently went on to complete a Master of Science degree in Civil Engineering at the University of Wisconsin–Madison, Master of Science in Technology and Policy at Massachusetts Institute of Technology(MIT). and Doctor of Science in Geotechnical Engineering at Massachusetts Institute of Technology (MIT). He received Royal Thai Government fellowship to pursue his graduate study and was a Microsoft scholar while studying at MIT.

Careers

King Mongkut's Institute of Technology Ladkrabang
Suchatvee began his career as a lecturer engineering at King Mongkut's Institute of Technology Ladkrabang in 2003  which he has expert in Geotechnical engineering Underground and Tunnel construction and he was appointed as Assistant President the same year.

In 2010 he was appointed professor of civil engineering at KMITL. and Dean of Engineering Faculty the same year.

He was graciously appointed to the President of KMITL first term in 2015 and second term in 2019. During his time as President he was contributor to development of institute. such as 
Research and Education collaboration between Carnegie Mellon University and KMITL causing CMKL University were founded in 2017.
He support to established Kosen-KMITL to develop manpower in engineering technology and innovation under memorandum of understanding between Kosen Institute and KMITL.
Establishment coding school 42 Bangkok through a memorandum of understanding between the institute and Ecole 42 Paris, France in 2019.
He founded  King Mongkut Chaokhun Tahan Hospital as president of the foundation in 2021 for treatment and a comprehensive medical innovation research center support the government to reduce technology imports Distribute assistance to hospitals both in the country and abroad. and can extend medical innovations for commercialization in the future During the President of KMITL, he participated in the founder of Faculty of Medicine KMITL, Institute of Music Science and Engineering (IMSE), 
 King Mongkut's Institute of Technology Ladkrabang International Demonstration School (KMIDS).

Education
During his time as President of KMITL. He was elected Chairperson of Council of University Presidents of Thailand (CUPT) 2 consecutive terms  from 2017 - 2020. During his period there have been changes the examination system for High School to higher education institutions from University Admission system to Thai University Central Admission System(TCAS) for reducing inequality.

In 2019 – 2020 He was appointed as the President of The Association of Southeast Asian Institutions of Higher Learning  is a non-governmental organization (NGO). Its aim is to assist member institutions to strengthen themselves through mutual self-help to achieve distinction in teaching, research, and public service, thereby contributing to their respective nations and beyond.

Civil Engineer
During his studies at MIT, Suchatvee returned to Thailand from 1999-2000 to work as a Geotechnical Engineering specialist in the Bangkok MRTA project. In that time he founded the Young Member Committee of Engineering Institute of Thailand, where he served as its first chairperson. He also became a member of the Geotechnical Engineering Committee of the Engineering Institute of Thailand in 1999. He was a member of the government panel who investigated the damage of runways and tarmacs at Bangkok's new Suvarnabhumi Airport. He is the Chairman of Thailand Underground and Tunneling Group (TUTG) in 2012. as a national member of the International Tunneling and Underground Space Association (ITA), the world organization which promotes underground use for human and environmental benefits.

In 2014, he was elected Chairman of Committee of the Engineering Institute of Thailand with term form 2014-2016.

Suchatvee was appointed as a board member of The Council of Engineers Thailand (COE). In 2015. He was later elected Chairman of The Council of Engineers Thailand in 2019. which he resigned in 2021 to candidate for the 2022 Bangkok gubernatorial election.

Political careers
On December 13, 2021, in a meeting of the Democrat Party Executive Committee, Suchatvee was unanimously approved as the party's candidate for the 2022 Bangkok gubernatorial election. Although not elected, but he received up to 254,723 votes (9.60%) for the second place.

In September 2022 Suchatvee has been named the Democrat Party list candidate in Bangkok. He will lead its Modern Education campaign efforts in the city for the next general election.
In October 2022 Jurin Laksanawisit, Democrat Party leader, has signed on to appoint him to Head of party's policy team on Bangkok Metropolitan Region. to prepare the upcoming general elections in early 2023

Other appointments 
On 11 March 2008 Suchatvee was appointed by Cabinet of Thailand to Board members and spokesperson for Board of State Railway of Thailand until November 2008 

In January 2012 Suchatvee was appointed by Cabinet of Thailand to Chairman of National Housing Authority (Thailand)  which has plans to launch 22 projects with 7,812 units worth 4.7 billion baht in July 2013  until he resigned on 20 September 2013.

In August 2014 Head of the National Council for Peace and Order (NCPO) has appointed him as a director of Bangkok Mass Transit Authority (BMTA)  the Executive Board of the organization has resolution to appoint him to take the Position as Chairman of the Sub-Committee on Promotion of Good Corporate Governance. until he resigned on August 4, 2016.

In June 2018 Cabinet of Thailand has approved and appointed him to Board members of Metropolitan Electricity Authority (MEA) until 4 June 2021

Suchatvee is also a Council Member of University Council Rajamangala University of Technology Srivijaya The first period on 14 February 2012  and the second period on 30 September 2017, Rangsit University During the year 2016-2021, Nakhonratchasima Rajabhat University on 29 June 2017

Royal decorations 
2017 -  Knight Commander (Second Class) Order of the White Elephant.
2022 -  Knight Grand Cross (First Class) Order of the Crown of Thailand.

References

External links
Suchatvee Official Website
‘Disruptor’ Suchatvee Suwansawat ready to shine his bright light on Bangkok on TPBS
Suchatvee on KMITL
New Bangkok Subway will tackle classic
Thailand's airport imbroglio grows

Living people
1972 births
Suchatvee Suwansawat
Suchatvee Suwansawat
Suchatvee Suwansawat
Massachusetts Institute of Technology alumni
Suchatvee Suwansawat
Suchatvee Suwansawat
Suchatvee Suwansawat
Suchatvee Suwansawat
Suchatvee Suwansawat
Suchatvee Suwansawat